The Bayer designations k Carinae and K Carinae are distinct.

for k Carinae, see HD 81101
for K Carinae, see HR 4138

Carinae, k
Carina (constellation)